Temple Butte, in the Grand Canyon, Arizona, US is a prominence below the East Rim. The butte lies on the west bank of the south-flowing Colorado River. The outfall from the Little Colorado River, draining from the Painted Desert to the east and southeast, is about two miles upstream.

It is the historical site of some wreckage of the 1956 Grand Canyon mid-air collision. It was first thought that smoke from Temple Butte, was due to a lightning strike fire, but later was found to be the result of the mid-air collision.

A closer view of Chuar and Temple Buttes.

Trails
The Tanner Trail from Desert View, Arizona down to the Colorado River, follows the west ridgeline of Tanner Canyon, and has numerous views looking due-north to Temple Butte. The trail ends at a viewpoint on the upper surfaces of a Redwall Limestone ridge. The Redwall Limestone is seen prominently below the East Rim, and is the cliff-forming shelf upon which the redbeds of the Supai Group accumulate.

Geology
The prominence of Temple Butte is composed of the upper unit of the Supai Group, ("redbeds"), the cliff-former, Esplanade Sandstone. The entire prominence is a much eroded, cliff remainder of the Esplanade, but the four units of the Supai Group, are compact, in an approximate north-south direction, with a large-pyramid-shape at the north, a pointed-pyramid at the south, and an eroded saddle in between.

The Supai Group sits on the platform, upper surface of the Redwall Limestone, on Cambrian rock units below. Another upper platform of the cliff-forming Muav Limestone, underlies the Redwall. (It is a double-platform rock unit.) The slopes of colorful Bright Angel Shale are below. And below that are the short cliffs of Tapeats Sandstone, (typically bordering gorges and the Colorado River), famous for making the Tonto Platform, above the 1,000-million year old Great Unconformity of lost time, and eroded rock units.

The east strike (section) of the Butte Fault is on the west side of Temple Butte. The west section of the Butte Fault is the East Kaibab Monocline. The Butte Fault sections are north-south trending, and are part of the uplift of the Kaibab Plateau.

Access
Desert View is the closest paved route site to Temple Butte viewpoints.

Observation viewpoints
Temple Butte can be viewed from the south at East Rim, Grand Canyon viewpoints in the vicinity of Desert View, Arizona. Lipan Point, Desert View Point, and to the south Hollenback Point have views due-north into the Grand Canyon.

An unimproved route, going north from Desert View, about 12 to 14 mi long ends at Cape Solitude; the point is adjacent the south canyon outfall of the Little Colorado River and canyon, with the Colorado River.

Gallery

References

 Arizona Road & Recreation Atlas, Benchmark Maps, 2nd Edition, c. 1998, 112 pages, pp. 28–29, 62–63.
 Arizona DeLorme Atlas & Gazetteer, 5th Edition, c. 2002, 76 pages, pp. 32, 24.

External links 

 Temple Butte, Eastern Grand Canyon, at Little Colorado River, (lat-long.com), coordinates, Coconino County, AZ

Grand Canyon
Landforms of Coconino County, Arizona
Mountains of Arizona
Mountains of Coconino County, Arizona